Ponyri is a rural locality (a khutor) in Bolshezhirovsky Selsoviet Rural Settlement, Fatezhsky District, Kursk Oblast, Russia. The population as of 2010 is 8.

Geography 
The khutor is located on the Nikovets Brook (a right tributary of the Ruda in the basin of the Svapa), 92 km from the Russia–Ukraine border, 35 km north-west of Kursk, 16.5 km south-west of the district center – the town Fatezh, 11 km from the selsoviet center – Bolshoye Zhirovo.

Climate
Ponyri has a warm-summer humid continental climate (Dfb in the Köppen climate classification).

Transport 
Ponyri is located 10 km from the federal route  Crimea Highway as part of the European route E105, 33.5 km from the road of regional importance  (Kursk – Ponyri), 13 km from the road  (Fatezh – 38K-018), 0.5 km from the road of intermunicipal significance  (M2 "Crimea Highway" – Kromskaya), 32 km from the nearest railway halt 433 km (railway line Lgov I — Kursk).

The rural locality is situated 38.5 km from Kursk Vostochny Airport, 153 km from Belgorod International Airport and 236 km from Voronezh Peter the Great Airport.

References

Notes

Sources

Rural localities in Fatezhsky District